Jarużyn may refer to the following places in Poland:

 Jarużyn, Kuyavian-Pomeranian Voivodeship
 Jarużyn, West Pomeranian Voivodeship
 Jarużyn-Kolonia